Thaandavam is a 2012 Indian Tamil-language neo-noir action thriller film written and directed by A. L. Vijay. The film stars an ensemble cast with Vikram, Jagapati Babu, Anushka Shetty, Amy Jackson, Lakshmi Rai, Nassar, Santhanam, Raj Arjun and Saranya in pivotal roles It is produced by UTV Motion Pictures and features music composed by G. V. Prakash Kumar. Thaandavam was released worldwide on 28 September 2012.

Plot
31 December 2010: At 11:59 pm, a sudden bomb blast occurs in London, killing several people.

After a year, A blind man named Kenny Thomas lays flowers on the memorial and mourns someone's death during the bomb blast. He is provided with secret details by a mysterious woman. Kenny takes a taxi driven by Sathyan, a comical Tamilian. Kenny kills someone and throws the body down. Sathyan flees. Kenny produces a sound from his mouth to find his way, which is later explained as echolocation. Kenny plays the piano in a church. He is blind and has so many people who care for him. Soon he carries out two more murders, taking the same taxi driven by the innocent Sathyan and following instructions from the mysterious woman. Inspector Veerakathi, a British Tamil officer is in charge of investigating the murders.

Sara Vinayagam, a British-born Anglo-Indian woman, wins the Miss London title, and to build her social profile, goes to Kenny's church. Initially, Kenny is aloof but eventually, they become friends. Sara's father is the doctor performing autopsies of the dead bodies. Veerakathi starts to suspect Kenny. As Sathyan is found on all the murder spots, the police arrest him, suspecting he has a connection with the murders. Sathyan finds a picture of Kenny in a local newspaper and informs Veerakathi of Kenny's connection.

Sathyan is released and meets Sara. Kenny who is about to kill the steel company owner named Victor, flees the scene after sensing their presence. He takes Sathyan's taxi to escape. Sara and Sathyan join him in pursuit. As he is blind, Kenny runs the taxi into a river. Taking refuge on a riverbank, Kenny's identity is revealed by the mysterious woman.

Kenny is a RAW officer from India, whose real name is Shivakumar and he marries Meenakshi, an eye doctor in Delhi. While handling a case where an Indian Army secret (a flowchart) about a WMD goes missing, Shiva has come to London. Things go radically wrong and he ends up becoming Kenny after the London bomb blast. The mysterious woman is the real Kenny's wife Geetha, who is taking revenge on those responsible for bomb blast in which Kenny is killed.  

What happens thereafter forms the movie's climax.

Cast

 Vikram as Shivakumar/Kenny Thomas/Arjun Rathore/Imran
 Jagapathi Babu as Sharath Kumar 
 Anushka Shetty as Meenakshi Shivakumar
 Amy Jackson as Miss London Sara Vinayagam Pillai
 Lakshmi Rai as Geetha Kenny 
 Santhanam as Sathyan, the Tamil-speaking taxi driver
 Nassar as Veerakathi Pillai
 Saranya as Shivakumar's mother
 Sathish as Modelling Agent
 Kota Srinivasa Rao as the Union Home Minister
 Sayaji Shinde as Ravi Chandran
 M. S. Bhaskar as Thambi Mama
 Thambi Ramaiah as Thappache Mama
 Delhi Ganesh as Meenakshi's father
 Rajie Vijay Sarathy as Meenakshi's mother
 Balaji Venugopal as Meenakshi's cousin
 Sujitha as Abi
 Daniel Kish as himself
 Alexx O'Nell as The Agent
 Raj Arjun as Kenny Thomas (Original)
 Subiksha Raman as Meera, Meenakshi's sister
 Daniel Jordan as Richard

Production
UTV Motion Pictures commenced an innovative title contest in Twitter, and it received massive response from Vikram fans. Vikram was revealed to play the role of a blind man, who practices the technique of human echolocation, the ability to detect objects, their position and size by sensing echoes. Vikram underwent special sessions with Daniel Kish, an internationally renowned expert of human echolocation. The team had planned to bring Kish to Chennai for the audio launch ceremony. Anushka was chosen to portray Vikram's wife in the film. Amy Jackson plays a British-born-Tamil girl in the film and was said to dub for herself as well. Telugu actor Jagapati Babu was selected to play villain.

Filming
Filming commenced in Chennai in early December 2011 and was to be held in various locations in the US for 60 days and later in Delhi and various locations across southern Tamil Nadu. Sources said that the film would be entirely shot in Los Angeles city. Almost 50 per cent of the shoot was completed with the Delhi and Chennai schedules. While "delays in getting the visa for the entire cast and crew" was the official reason given for the change of location from the US to the UK, sources told that the move was also necessitated to keep the budget from skyrocketing. Some scenes were shot in UK, including a song and dance scene shot at Botany Bay in Kent. Lakshmi Rai joined the team in London in April 2012. A duet song between Vikram and Amy was shot on the River Thames.

Soundtrack

The soundtrack album was composed by G. V. Prakash Kumar, featuring lyrics written by Na. Muthukumar. It is the 25th album of the music director.

Release
The film helped raise  for the National Association of Blind (NAB) through its premiere show donor passes. The film released about 1000+ screens worldwide. The satellite rights of the film were sold to STAR Vijay. The film was later dubbed in Hindi under the title Desh Prem The Real Hero.

Critical reception
Thaandavam received mixed-to-positive reviews from critics and audience, with praise on the film's cast performance, music, story. However, the film's screenplay pattern and darkness received criticism. The Times of India rated the film 3/5, writing "Director Vijay and actor Vikram collaborate again in this movie after their earlier successful outing in Deiva Thirumagal, And Thaandavam'has everything going for it – big cast, good locations, a story with potential and a competent director – yet the result is far from satisfactory because of a weak and meandering screenplay, and poor pacing." Rediff's Pavithra Srinivasan wrote that the film was a "damp squib" and gave 2 out of 5 stars. Indiaglitz wrote: "Thaandavam has  good sides and  bad ones". Sify's reviewer claimed that it was "Vikram and him alone who diverts your attention from the film's little logical script flaws and spellbinds you with an endearing act that is Thaandavam's biggest strength". in.com's critic stated that it was a "neat revenge saga", further adding that it was "worth a watch for its neat screenplay and lavish production values", while giving it 3 out of 5. Prakash Upadhyaya of Oneindia.in gave 3/5 and wrote "Thaandavam is not glamorous but it is rich. It does not have masala elements yet it is entertaining". Tamilko wrote: "Thaandavam’s dreary screenplay hampers the much needed pace for a film set in espionage backdrop. Though Vikram greatly rescues the movie, the dull and predictable sequences doesn’t help Thaandavam’s course". The Hindu described it as a fiery dance of the righteous.

Awards

References

External links

2012 films
2012 action thriller films
Indian action thriller films
Films directed by A. L. Vijay
Films scored by G. V. Prakash Kumar
2010s Tamil-language films
Films set in London
Films shot in London
Films about terrorism in India
Mass murder in fiction
Fictional portrayals of the Tamil Nadu Police
Films set in Uttar Pradesh
Films shot in Agra
Films set in Delhi
Films shot in Delhi
Films about blind people in India
UTV Motion Pictures films
Indian films about revenge
Films involved in plagiarism controversies
Films about the Research and Analysis Wing